Joachim Friedrich Henckel (4 March 1712 in Preussisch Holland – 1 July 1779) was a Prussian surgeon at Charité hospital in Berlin.

His publications include Medical and Surgical Observations (1744).

In 1769, Henckel conducted the first caesarean section to incise the linea alba on a living woman.  The child survived, though the mother later died, probably due to peritonitis. The surgery drew so much attention that King Frederick II named Henckel professor of surgery and a Court Counselor. From 1773 to 1779, Henckel served as director of the Charité.

References

1712 births
German surgeons
1779 deaths
People from Pasłęk
People from East Prussia
Physicians of the Charité